Ariocarpus scaphirostris is a species of plant in the family Cactaceae. The Ariocarpus scaphirostris was originally called Ariocarpus scapharostrus in the 1930. D. R. Hunt, however, changed it to Ariocarpus scaphirostris.

It is endemic to Nuevo León state in northeastern Mexico.

Its natural habitat is hot deserts.

The plant is slow growing and also produces rare flowers.

References

External links

Scaphirostris
Cacti of Mexico
Endemic flora of Mexico
Flora of Nuevo León
Endangered biota of Mexico
Vulnerable plants
Taxonomy articles created by Polbot